Murat Ruslanovich Khasanov (Russian: Мура́т Русла́нович Хаса́нов); (10 December 1970) is a Russian Sambist and Judoka.  He is the only 11-time world heavyweight champion in Sambo. Considered to be one of the greatest practitioners of Sambo and is a member of the FIAS Hall of fame. For high sporting achievements, in 1995 he was awarded the honorary title "Honored Master of Sports of Russia" in Sambo, and in 2003 he was awarded the Order of Friendship.  He is currently a Member of the State Duma of the Federal Assembly of the Russian Federation.

Biography

Born on December 10, 1970, in the village of Egerukhay within the Koshekhablsky District of Adyghe Autonomous Oblast . He began to play sports in his native village under the guidance of coach Shiham Berzegov. In 1986 he began to study in the Maykop specialized sports school for children and youth of the Olympic reserve.

In 1992 he graduated from the Faculty of Physical Education of the Maykop Pedagogical Institute and in 2004 from the Faculty of Law of the Adyghe State University.

Sports career

Khasanov had a very successful career in Sambo where he won 11 World Championships. He was captain of the Russian National Team in Sambo for over a decade. From 1997 to the end of his sports career, he did not suffer a single defeat.

Khasanov also had success in Judo. At the 1994 European Judo Championships he finished 5th in the heavyweight (+95 kg) class. He finished first in the 1999 Russian National championships and Second in the 2000 World Masters Munich Championships.

Political career

On 17 January 2007, he was appointed Chairman of the Committee for Physical Culture and Sport of the Republic of Adygea.

Since 28 September 2016, he has been a member of the 7th State Duma of the Federal Assembly of the Russian Federation.

On 24 March 2022, the United States Treasury sanctioned him in response to the 2022 Russian invasion of Ukraine.

Accomplishments

Sambo
 Fédération Internationale de Sambo (FIAS)
 World Sambo Championships winner (11 times)
 World Cup Winner (8 times)
 European Championship winner (7 times)
 Russian Championship winner (19 times)

Judo
 World Masters Munich
 2000 Munich, 2nd place 
 European Judo Union
 1994 European Judo Championships 5th place
 Russian Judo Federation
 1999 Russian National Championship 1st place
 1998 Russian National Championship 3rd place
 1997 Russian National Championship 2nd place

References

1970 births
Living people
Russian male judoka
Russian sambo practitioners
21st-century Russian politicians
Russian sportsperson-politicians
United Russia politicians
Seventh convocation members of the State Duma (Russian Federation)
Eighth convocation members of the State Duma (Russian Federation)
Russian individuals subject to the U.S. Department of the Treasury sanctions